Basti Masim gizi Bagirova (Bağçakürd, 10 April 1906 – Bağçakürd, 27 February 1962) was an Azerbaijani cotton grower and politician. She is known as one of the first Stakhanovites in the Azerbaijan SSR.

Work 
In 1930, Bagirova started working at the Voroshilov agricultural artel, which would later become a collective farm. This farm would eventually be named after Bagirova. In 1953, Bagirova was elected as chair of the collective farm. She held this position until her death in 1962.

Politics 
Basi Bagirova was a member of the Communist Party since 1937. She was a member the Supreme Soviet of the Soviet Union from the 1st to the 3rd convocations. She was also member of the Supreme Soviet of Azerbaijan SSR during 4th and 5th convocations, and member of the Presidium during the 5th convocation. She was a member of the Central Committee of the Communist Party of Azerbaijan. She was a delegate to the 20th Congress of the Communist Party of the Soviet Union and the XXIII, XXIV and XXV congresses of the Communist Party of Azerbaijan.

Awards 
 Twice Hero of Socialist Labour (19 March 1947 and 17 June 1950)
 Three Orders of Lenin (19 March 1947, 10 March 1948, 17 March 1950)
 Order of the Red Banner of Labour (27 January 1936)
 Medal "For Labour Valour" (7 March 1960)
 Medal of the All-Union Agricultural Exhibition

Memorials 
A bronze bust was erected at Bağçakürd in her honour. There is also a street named after her in Baku.

See also 
 Shamama Hasanova

References

External links
 Obituary

1906 births
1962 deaths
20th-century Azerbaijani women politicians
20th-century Azerbaijani politicians
People from Goranboy District
People from Elizavetpol Governorate
Azerbaijan Communist Party (1920) politicians
Heroes of Socialist Labour
Recipients of the Order of Lenin
Recipients of the Order of the Red Banner of Labour
Women farmers
First convocation members of the Soviet of Nationalities
Second convocation members of the Supreme Soviet of the Soviet Union
Third convocation members of the Supreme Soviet of the Soviet Union
Soviet women in politics